Jakob Frederik "Sjaak" Köhler (2 October 1902 – 19 June 1970) was a Dutch water polo player and swimmer. He finished in seventh and fifth place with the Dutch water polo team at the 1924 and 1928 Olympics; at both Games he played three matches and scored four and two goals, respectively. In 1924 he also competed in two freestyle swimming events (400 m and 4×200 m relay), but failed to reach the finals. His cousin Koos played water polo alongside Sjaak at the 1928 Olympics.

References

1902 births
1970 deaths
Dutch male water polo players
Dutch male freestyle swimmers
Olympic swimmers of the Netherlands
Olympic water polo players of the Netherlands
Swimmers at the 1924 Summer Olympics
Water polo players at the 1924 Summer Olympics
Water polo players at the 1928 Summer Olympics
Water polo players from Amsterdam
20th-century Dutch people